Siroco may refer to:
 Sirocco, the wind
 Siroco (album) by Paco de Lucia
 Siroco (L 9012), a landing ship of the French Navy
 French destroyer Siroco
 Spanish submarine Siroco
 Mehmed Siroco (1525–1571), nickname of an Ottoman admiral